A timeline of the Indian Rebellion of 1857 which began as a mutiny of sepoys of British East India Company's army on 10 May 1857, in the town of Meerut, and soon erupted into other mutinies and civilian rebellions largely in the Upper Gangetic plain and Central India.

Timeline

1857

1858

1859

Further reading

References

Indian Rebellion of 1857
Indian history timelines
Indian Rebellion of 1857
British East India Company
Mutinies